My Nametags is a UK-based company founded in 2004 by Lars Andersen. The company manufactures durable stickers and iron-on labels. The French counterpart of the company is called Etikol.

History
My Nametags started making labels in 2004 in London by Lars Andersen, who is currently serving as its MD. Since then My Nametags has expanded to five other European countries. The first country they expanded to was Ireland. Parents lose up to £150 a year replacing lost school uniform because they don’t use name tags and labels. The company was started to solve this problem.

My Nametags exports to sixty countries globally.

References

External links 
 Official Website

2004 establishments in the United Kingdom
British companies established in 2004
Companies based in the London Borough of Wandsworth
Companies established in 2004
Manufacturing companies of the United Kingdom